Yann Le Bohec (26 April 1943, Carthage) is a French historian and epigraphist, specializing in ancient Rome, in particular North Africa during Antiquity and military history.

Works

Military History 
1979: 
1989: 
1989: 
1990: 
1995: 
2001: 
2002: 
2006: 
2009: 
2012: Alésia : Fin août-début octobre de 52 avant J-C., Paris, Tallandier
2013: La « bataille » du Teutoburg, 9 apr. J.-C., Paris, Éditions Lemme, series "Illustoria"
2013: La bataille de Lyon, 197 apr. J.-C., Paris, Éditions Lemme, series "Illustoria"
2014: 
2014: Histoire militaire des guerres puniques : 264-146 av. J.-C., Paris, Tallandier, series "Texto"
2014: Géopolitique de l'Empire Romain, Paris, Ellipses
2015: 
2016:

Other 
1991: 
1993: Yann Le Bohec, Christophe Badel, Sources d'histoire romaine: Ier siècle av. J.C., début du Ve siècle après J.C, Paris, Larousse, series "Textes essentiels"
1994: 
1997: 
2001: 
2003: 
2004: De Zeus à Allah. les grandes religions du monde méditerranéen [under his direction], Paris, Éditions du Temps
2004: Les religions triomphantes au Moyen Âge : De Mahomet à Thomas d'Aquin [under his direction], Paris, Éditions du Temps
2005: 
2012: 
2012: 
2013:

Popular science articles 
2009:

External links 
 Yann LE BOHEC resume on paris-sorbonne.fr
 Yann le Bohec, Le miracle romain
 La guerre romaine, de Yann Le Bohec
 César et l'art de la guerre, France Culture, 24 February 2015

20th-century French historians
French scholars of Roman history
French military historians
Academic staff of the University of Lyon
French epigraphers
People from Carthage
1943 births
Living people